Robert L. Hengehold (born 18 June 1936) is an American physicist from the Air Force Institute of Technology. He was awarded the status of Fellow in the American Physical Society, after they were nominated by their Forum on Industrial and Applied Physics  in 2008, for pioneering contributions to semiconductor material characterization, over 30 years of distinguished and dedicated leadership in the development of graduate applied physics programs for military officers, and service to the physics community through APS sectional meetings specifically on applied and industrial phy

References 

Fellows of the American Physical Society
American Physical Society
American physicists
Living people
1936 births